The Times Top 100 Graduate Employers is a list of the top employers for graduates in the United Kingdom. The Top 100 book is published annually by The Times newspaper and High Fliers Publications Limited, and an accompanying website provides live, up-to-date information for university students. The list is collated based on a research gathered in the largest final year student survey of its kind, The UK Graduate Careers Survey, and last year nearly 20,000 students took part in the research.

It has been published every year since 1999, and the 2018–2019 edition marked the 20th year of the Top 100. 

The editor is Martin Birchall, managing director of High Fliers.

Books
1999–2000: , Published 1 October 1999
2000–2001: 
2001–2002: 
2002–2003: , Published 10 September 2002
2003–2004: , Published 8 September 2003
2004–2005: , Published 13 September 2004
2005–2006: , Published 15 September 2005
2006–2007: , Published 14 September 2006
2007–2008: , Published 13 September 2007
2008–2009: , Published 18 September 2008
2009–2010: , Published 16 September 2009
2010–2011: , Published 15 September 2010
2011–2012: , Published 14 September 2011
2012–2013: , Published 19 September 2012
2013–2014: , Published 18 September 2013
2014–2015: , Published 17 September 2014
2015–2016: , Published 6 October 2015
2016–2017: , Published 4 October 2016
2017–2018: , Published 4 October 2017
2018–2019: , Published 26 September 2018

External links
 Official website
 High Fliers

Yearbooks
The Times